Manteriella is a genus of trematodes in the family Opecoelidae.

Species
Manteriella chanis Shen, 1986
Manteriella crassa (Manter, 1947) Yamaguti, 1958
Manteriella hainanensis Shen, 1990
Manteriella yamagutii Ahmad, 1990

Species later synonymised with species of Manteriella
Manteriella crassa (Manter, 1947) Yamaguti, 1958
Horatrema crassum Manter, 1947

References

Opecoelidae
Plagiorchiida genera